The Fugazy Bowl was a stadium on Coney Island in Brooklyn, New York. 

Originally called the Coney Island Stadium, it was situated on Surf Avenue near West Sixth Street. It was named after Humbert Fugazy in the 1930s when he promoted boxing shows there. Open during the 1920s and the 1930s, it could hold up to 12,000 people. It was the site of a June 25, 1926, boxing match between Ruby Goldstein and Ace Hudkins.

References
"Fugazy Bowl" in the Boxrec Boxing Encyclopaedia website

Coney Island
Boxing venues in New York City
Defunct boxing venues in the United States